Prior to the 20th Century, there were few women in law in the United Kingdom. Prior to the Sex Disqualification (Removal) Act 1919, women were not permitted to practice law in the United Kingdom.  By 1931 there were around 100 female solicitors. The first female-only law partnership was founded in 1933. By 2019 51% of British solicitors were women.

Background

Eliza Orme was the first woman in the United Kingdom to obtain a law degree, in 1888. In 1892, Cornelia Sorabji became the first woman to study law at Oxford University.

Barristers

The Sex Disqualification (Removal) Act 1919 received Royal Assent on 23 December 1919. The next day, Helena Normanton became the first woman to join an Inns of Court.

In 1903, Bertha Cave applied to join Gray's Inn; the application was ultimately rejected.

In 1913, the Law Society refused to allow women to take legal exams; this was challenged in the Court of Appeal in the case of Bebb v The Law Society, where the Law Society's stance was upheld. The plaintiff in that case was Gwyneth Bebb, who was expected to be the first female to be called to the bar but died before that could happen.

In 1922, Ivy Williams was the first woman called to the bar (although she never practiced), and Helena Normanton became the first practising female barrister in the UK. In September 2018 a barristers' chambers was renamed in her honour. Williams was also the first woman to teach law at an English university, whilst Normanton, along with Rose Heilbron, were the first two female barristers to be appointed King's Counsel, in 1949. Heibron was also the first woman to achieve a first class honours degree in law at the University of Liverpool (in 1935), England's first woman judge as Recorder of Burnley (in 1956), the first woman to sit as a judge in the Old Bailey (in 1972), the second female High Court judge (in 1974), and the first woman Presiding Judge of any Circuit when she became Presiding Judge on the Northern Circuit (in 1978).

Elizabeth Lane became the first female County Court judge, and the first English High Court judge.

In 2002, the Law Society appointed its first female President, Carolyn Kirby.

In 2017, Baroness Hale became the first female president of the Supreme Court.

Solicitors

In 1922, Carrie Morrison, Mary Pickup, Mary Sykes, and Maud Crofts became the first women in England to qualify as solicitors; Morrison was the first of them admitted as a solicitor.

In 2010, a report by The Lawyer found that 22 percent of partners at the UK's top 100 firms were women; a follow-up report in 2015 found that figure had not changed.

Since 2014, a number of large corporate firms of solicitors have set gender diversity targets to increase the percentage of women within their partnerships.

Key Women in UK Law

Scotland 

Lynda Clark, Baroness Clark of Calton - first Advocate General for Scotland
Leeona Dorrian, Lady Dorrian - Lord Justice Clerk, the second most senior judge in Scotland.
Anne Smith, Lady Smith - High Court Judge and Senator of the College of Justice.
 Ann Paton, Lady Paton - High Court Judge and Senator of the College of Justice. Currently Scotland's longest-serving female judge.
 Valerie Stacey, Lady Stacey - Supreme Court Judge and Senator of the College of Justice. The first woman elected Vice-Dean of the Faculty of Advocates.
 Maggie Scott, Lady Scott - Abdelbaset al-Megrahi's lead counsel, a Judge and Senator of the College of Justice.
Morag Wise, Lady Wise - Supreme Court Judge and Senator of the College of Justice.
Rita Rae, Lady Rae - Supreme Court Judge and Senator of the College of Justice.
Ailsa Carmichael, Lady Carmichael - Judge and Senator of the College of Justice.
Sarah P. L. Wolffe, Lady Wolffe - first woman to be appointed as a Commercial Judge.
Lorna Jack - Chief Executive at the Law Society since January 2009.

See also
Women in law
Legal professions in England and Wales
Northern Ireland law
Scots law

References

1888 establishments in the United Kingdom
Women
United Kingdom